Commander Steel is a fictional character and a superhero. He first appeared in Grand Slam Comics Vol. 3 #9 (33), August 1944, published by Anglo-American Publishing.

Character history
Injured at one of the Battles of El Alamein, he was rescued by a scientist and given the “Elixir of Power”, which granted him superhuman strength and durability. He served in the International Police Service during the war.

Powers and abilities
Commander Steel had superhuman strength and durability.

See also
Anglo-American Publishing
Canadian comics

References

External links
Commander Steel at International Hero UK

Canadian superheroes
Comics characters introduced in 1944
Golden Age superheroes